Grenfell Street is a major street in the north-east quarter of the Adelaide city centre, South Australia. The street runs west-east from King William Street to East Terrace. On the other side of King William Street, it continues as Currie Street. Its intersection with Pulteney Street is encircled by Hindmarsh Square.

A dedicated bus lane runs the whole length of both Grenfell and Currie Streets, limiting private vehicles to one lane for most of its length, and carrying nearly all bus traffic traversing the city in an east-west direction. At the eastern end of Grenfell, a dedicated bus track carries buses across East Terrace into the O-Bahn tunnel under Rymill Park.

History

Grenfell Street was named after Pascoe St Leger Grenfell, a Cornish businessman and member of the South Australian Church Society. His significant donation of an acre of land on North Terrace was used for the construction of the Holy Trinity Church — one of the first churches built in the city.  Grenfell also donated another  of country land for the use of the church as glebe lands. This land later became the suburb of Trinity Gardens.

In July 2012, dedicated bus lanes were introduced along the full length of Grenfell Street in both directions, in operation from 7am to 7pm each weekday.

In December 2016, after the O-Bahn extension tunnel was built underneath Rymill Park at the eastern end of the street, buses formerly routed along North Terrace were permanently routed along Grenfell (although they had been temporarily diverted from North Terrace via East Terrace, since construction of the Botanic Line of the Adelaide trams had begun in early October that year). After this, nearly all buses travelling in an east-west direction across the city use Grenfell.

Central Hall/ Queen's Hall/ Embassy Ballroom

Central Hall, at no. 102a Grenfell, was built by a Mrs Phillipson, of  Glenelg, for the use of the Adelaide German Club (Allgemeiner Deutscher Verein) in 1894, opening in June of that year. It was subsequently used for a variety of community events (many unrelated to the club), for around 20 years.  Charles Cawthorne took over the lease and reopened it Queen's Hall on 7 August 1915. Its use turned to performances, mainly concerts, operas, dramas, and fundraisers for World War I, and it also hosted occasional variety shows. Its use  as a theatre diminished from 1923, and by 1929 it was operating as a dance hall. The building was partially destroyed by fire on 4 November 1929, and it fell into disuse until it was refurbished and reopened in 1933 as the Embassy Ballroom, which had an Art Deco facade. In the 1950s it was converted into a cinema, first called the Plaza Theatre and renamed Paris Cinema in 1965. It was later demolished and Regent Arcade built on the site.

Description

Grenfell Street runs from King William Street to East Terrace.

On the other side of King William Street, the western continuation of Grenfell Street is Currie Street, named after Raikes Currie, a member of the South Australian Association and South Australian Company.

The section of the street which runs parallel to Rundle Mall (west of Hindmarsh Square) features many retail outlets, as well as the southern entrances of many of the arcades, side-streets, and eateries of the mall. Office buildings and night spots also populate the street. The eastern end is occupied on the south side by the Tandanya National Aboriginal Cultural Institute, an art and cultural museum also used as a venue for the Adelaide Fringe and other events, and on the north side by the East End Markets redevelopment.

Heritage-listed buildings

On the corner of Grenfell Street and East Terrace there is the old Grenfell Street Power Station building. Much of the building now houses the Tandanya National Aboriginal Cultural Institute, facing Grenfell Street, which was heritage-listed on the SA Heritage Register in November 1984, while the old converter stations face East Terrace. There is an "Historic Engineering Plaque" on a ground level plinth just east of the north-east corner of the Tandanya building, which was dedicated by the Institution of Engineers, Australia, the Electricity Trust of South Australia and the Adelaide City Council on 6 April 1995.

Other heritage-listed buildings in Grenfell Street include:
the Wiggs Building (former home of stationers E. S. Wigg & Son)
 the Crown and Anchor Hotel (first licensed 1853, rebuilt 1880s)
parts of the former Adelaide Fruit and Produce Exchange facing the street
the British & Foreign Bible Society office (Bertram Hall)
several other office buildings

The Griffins Hotel, built in 1886, is on the corner of Grenfell Street and Hindmarsh Square; its address is 40 Hindmarsh Square.

Junction list

See also

References

Streets in Adelaide